Eta Arietis, Latinized from η Arietis, is the Bayer designation for a star in the northern constellation of Aries. It is dimly visible to the naked eye with an apparent visual magnitude of 5.231. It is drifting further away with a radial velocity of +4.5 km/s.

This is an F-type main sequence star with a stellar classification of F5 V. It is younger than the Sun at an age of about 2.6 billion years. The effective temperature of the outer atmosphere is 6,380 K, giving it the yellow-white-hued glow of an F-type star. Eta Arietis was examined using the HARPS instrument for radial velocity variations that may be caused by an orbiting companion, but no signal was detected. Nor has an infrared excess been detected using the Spitzer Space Telescope, which might otherwise indicate the presence of circumstellar gas or dust.

References

External links
Aladin previewer
Aladin sky atlas
 HR 646

F-type main-sequence stars
Aries (constellation)
Arietis, Eta
BD+20 0348
Arietis, 17
1043
013555
010306
0646